Sergio Mantecón Gutiérrez (born 25 September 1984) is a Spanish cross-country mountain biker. At the 2012 Summer Olympics, he competed in the Men's cross-country at Hadleigh Farm, finishing in 22nd place.

Major results

MTB
2008
 1st  National XCM Championships
2010
 1st  National XCO Championships
2011
 1st  National XCM Championships
2012
 1st  National XCO Championships
 1st  National XCM Championships
 2nd  European XCO Championships

Road
2010
 1st Overall Cinturón a Mallorca
 1st  Road race, National Amateur Road Championships

Cyclo-cross
2011–2012
 3rd National Championships

References

External links

Spanish male cyclists
Cross-country mountain bikers
1984 births
Cyclists from Cantabria
Sportspeople from Santander, Spain
Living people
Olympic cyclists of Spain
Cyclists at the 2012 Summer Olympics
Cyclists at the 2015 European Games
European Games competitors for Spain